Gyrinomimus grahami is a flabby whalefish of the genus Gyrinomimus, found in all the southern oceans.

Size

Etymology
The fish is named in honor of David H. Graham, a New Zealand ichthyologist and marine biologist.

References

 
 Tony Ayling & Geoffrey Cox, Collins Guide to the Sea Fishes of New Zealand,  (William Collins Publishers Ltd, Auckland, New Zealand 1982) 

Cetomimiformes
Taxa named by Laurence R. Richardson
Taxa named by Jack Garrick
Fish described in 1964